Löyly is a public sauna, restaurant and bar in Hernesaari, Helsinki, Finland. Its address is Hernesaarenranta 4. Löyly opened in 2016.

Löyly's owner is actor Jasper Pääkkönen. The building is designed by Avanto Architects Ltd. Hernesaari is a former industrial area on the Helsinki sea shore that will be built into a residential area. New use is developed for the area already now while waiting for the future change. As the site is part of Helsinki Park following the capital's coastline, the sauna was developed into an easy-going undulating artificial topography that is more a part of the landscape than a conventional box like building. The structure is like a big stone on the sea shore, Interesting views open up to city centre and even to open sea between wooden lamellas that cover the warm building mass. The whole building forms also a huge outdoor auditorium and you can climb on the roof terrace and even on the lookout terrace to enjoy the views. Löyly offers foreign visitors a public all year round sauna experience – a must when visiting Finland.

The building has become one of Helsinki main tourist attractions. Löyly is published in many leading magazines and newspapers. Time magazine included Löyly in its 2018 list of the World's 100 Greatest Places. CNN′s Richard Quest called Löyly "chic" in March 2019 and also Vogue highlighted Löyly in their 2017 coverage.

The building's unique architecture has won numerous prizes including: Chicago Athenaeum international architecture award 2018, Architizer A+ Awards Jury + Popular Vote Winner 2017, Iconic best of best 2017, IOC IAKS Award Silver medal 2017, Build architecture award 2017, Helsinki City building control quality award "Rose for Building" 2016, WAN Wood in Architecture 2016. The project got an honorary mention in International Space Design Award Idea tops 2016. The project was finalist in following competitions: Prix International d’Architecture Bois 2018, Nordic Architecture Fair Award 2017. Löyly was nominated for Mies van der Rohe –prize 2017, Finlandia prize for Architecture 2016, Philippe Rotthier European Prize for Architecture 2017 (was selected in the catalog), Finnish Interior Architecture Journalists’ Prize 2017, and both for Finnish Wood, Concrete and Steel prizes in 2016.

See also

 Finnish sauna

References

External links

 Homepage
https://avan.to/
https://www.archdaily.com/790432/loyly-avanto-architects
https://www.dezeen.com/2016/06/30/avanto-architects-loyly-coastal-sauna-helsinki-faceted-timber-cloak/
https://www.woodarchitecture.fi/projects/loyly
http://navi.finnisharchitecture.fi/en/loyly-public-sauna-and-restaurant/

Buildings and structures in Helsinki
Restaurants in Helsinki
Restaurants established in 2016
Tourist attractions in Helsinki
2016 establishments in Finland
Saunas
Länsisatama